Apocalypse is the second studio album by American musician Thundercat. It was released in July 2013 under the label Brainfeeder.

In February 2014, Thundercat released a double video on the MySpace website for the 10th and 11th tracks from the album, respectively titled "Evangelion" and "We'll Die", which were both directed by the photographer B+ (Brian Cross), who also shot the album art.

Track listing

Charts

References

External links
 

2013 albums
Brainfeeder albums
Albums produced by Flying Lotus
Thundercat (musician) albums